Typhoon Fitow was the ninth named tropical storm of the 2007 Pacific typhoon season that made landfall in Japan.
At its peak, it was thought to have been a minimal Category 2 typhoon by the JTWC, but was, in post-storm analysis, downgraded to a Category 1-equivalent typhoon by the Joint Typhoon Warning Center. The name Fitow was contributed by the Federated States of Micronesia, and is Yapese for a beautiful fragrant flower. The typhoon killed at least 2 people in Tokyo and was the first typhoon to hit the city since Typhoon Mawar in 2005. Damage from Fitow totaled to around 1 billion (2007 USD).

Meteorological history

On August 26 a Tropical disturbance developed in the Western Pacific Ocean to the northeast of Saipan and was designated as a minor tropical depression by the Japan Meteorological Agency early that day. The next day the Joint Typhoon Warning Center assessed the disturbances chances of forming, into a significant tropical cyclone within 24 hours as poor. On August 27 the JTWC reassessed the disturbances chances of forming into a significant tropical cyclone within 24 hours as fair and then later that day upgraded the disturbances chances of forming into a significant tropical cyclone as good and issued a tropical cyclone formation alert.

Later that day The JTWC began issuing warnings on Tropical Depression 10W, The next morning the system intensified quickly, under favourable conditions, becoming Tropical Storm Fitow  that morning and then a severe tropical storm by the afternoon of August 29.

Late on the August 29, the JTWC upgraded Tropical storm 10W (Fitow) to Typhoon 10W (Fitow). "due to rapid intensification of the system", which had continued to consolidate.
 However it was not designated as a Typhoon by the JMA until August 30  Fitow then maintained Typhoon intensity with peak 10 minute wind speeds of  until late on September 1 where it weakened into a Severe Tropical Storm with wind speeds of  it then Re-strengthened into Typhoon Fitow on September 5  Then Late on the September 6 Typhoon Fitow made landfall on the Izu Peninsula with winds gusting to  winds. Early the next day The JMA then downgraded Fitow to a Severe tropical Storm  The JTWC released their final advisory on the system due to Fitow undergoing its Extra-Tropical Transition. The JMA then downgraded Fitow to a Tropical Storm  and then dissipated on the 8 September.

Preparations
In Japan Flood Warnings and Evacuation Orders were issued from the west of Tokyo to the Tama River. At least 140 flights in and out of Japan were cancelled, stranding over 30,000 passengers. Several oil companies halted shipping due to Fitow. Bullet train services were also cancelled. A total of 223 flights were cancelled due to the storm, stranding over 36,000 people.

Impact

Japan

The water level of the Tama River exceeded dangerous level because of the heavy rain by Typhoon Fitow. Twenty-nine people were rescued from sandbanks on the Tama River on September 7 after the storm impacted Japan with powerful winds and heavy rain. At least 80,000 people were left without power as high winds from Fitow knocked down power lines. A 76-year-old man was killed when a tree limb fell on him. Several homes were reportedly destroyed by the typhoon. Three people were killed and 87 others were injured by Fitow throughout Japan. Heavy rains triggered 527 landslides throughout the country. Fourteen structures were destroyed, 62 were damaged, and another 1,941 were affected. A total of 17,037 hectares of farmland was damaged or destroyed by Fitow. About 1,113 km of roads, 1 km of railway, 14 ports, seven bridges, and six dykes were damaged. A total of 229,916 families were left without power at the height of the storm of which 4,010 also lost water supply. Nineteen ships sank during the storm. Agricultural losses amounted to $137 million (2007 USD). Total damages from the typhoon were estimated at $1 billion (2007 USD).

Russia
Fitow brought high winds, heavy rains, and large swells to parts of eastern Russia after transitioning into an extratropical cyclone. At least four villages, with a total population of 2,000, were affected by floods triggered by the remnants of the typhoon. In a 24‑hour span, some areas recorded rainfalls equivalent to a monthly rainfall total, causing numerous rivers to overflow their banks. Power was knocked out to several communities and a few roads and bridges were washed out by floods. Officials evacuated most of the residents in the flooded areas as a precaution.

See also

 List of notable tropical cyclones
 2007 Pacific typhoon season
 Timeline of the 2007 Pacific typhoon season

References

External links

JMA General Information of Typhoon Fitow (0709) from Digital Typhoon
JMA Best Track Data of Typhoon Fitow (0709) 
JMA Best Track Data (Graphics) of Typhoon Fitow (0709)
JMA Best Track Data (Text)
JTWC Best Track Data of Typhoon 10W (Fitow)
10W.FITOW from the U.S. Naval Research Laboratory

2007 Pacific typhoon season
Typhoons in Japan
Typhoon Fitow
Typhoons
Fitow